Global Trust Bank (Uganda) Limited (GTBU), commonly referred to as Global Trust Bank (GTBU), was a commercial bank in Uganda which started operations in 2008 and was closed down in 2014. Its headquarters were located in a five-storey building on Kampala Road in the center of Uganda’s capital, Kampala. It was licensed as a commercial bank by Bank of Uganda, the central bank and national banking regulator.

The bank was  a small financial services provider in Uganda. , its total asset valuation was approximately US$35.1 million (UGX:85 billion), with shareholders' equity of about US$17.2 million (UGX:41.53 billion). Available reports indicate that the bank broke even in 2011 and began making profits in 2012. Global Trust Bank was evaluating the introduction of Sharia banking in Uganda.

Ownership
, Global Trust Bank was 45.3% owned by  Nigeria’s largest insurance company Industrial and General Insurance Company Plc. (IGI). The remaining 54.7% was owned by four corporate investors, each holding less than 5%, and by eight individual investors, each holding no more than 5% of the bank's issued and authorized share capital.

 Other than IGI, none of the other corporate and individual shareholders of the Bank held up to 5% of the issued and authorized share capital of the Bank.

Domestic Branches
, Global Trust Bank had a network of branches at the following locations:

 Operational branches

 Busia Branch - 1 Sofia Road, Customs Yard, Busia
 Butaleja Branch - Butaleja District Headquarters, Butaleja
 Bwaise Branch - 975-976 Sir Apollo Kaggwa Road, Bwaise, Kampala
 Entebbe Airport Branch - Entebbe International Airport, Entebbe 
 Head Office - 2A Kampala Road, Kampala (Main Branch)
 Kibuku Branch - Kibuku District Headquarters, Kibuku
 Kikuubo Branch - 1st Floor Nabugabo Business Centre, Kampala
 Malaba Branch -  Malaba Customs Building, Malaba 
 Mbarara Branch - 4 Bulemba Road, Mbarara
 Mbale Branch - 1-3 Manafwa Road, Mbale
 Mukono Branch - 36 Jinja Road, Mukono
 Mutukula Branch - Mutukula URA Building, Customs Bond, Mutukula
 Najjanankumbi Branch - 1032 Block 12 Entebbe Road, Najjanankumbi
 Nateete Branch - 757 Wakaliga, Nateete, Kampala
 Nkozi Branch - Uganda Martyrs University Campus, Nkozi
 Owino Branch - St. Balikuddembe Market, 19 Nakivubo Place, Kampala
 Paidha Branch - 21 Nebbi- Arua Road, Paidha
 Pallisa Branch - 8 Kasodo Road, Pallisa
 Rubirizi District - Rubirizi, Rubirizi District
 Serere Branch - Serere District Headquarters, Serere 
 Tororo Branch - 11/9 Mbale Road, Tororo

 Branches in development

 Amuria Branch - Amuria, Amuria District
 Gulu University Branch -  Gulu University Campus, Gulu
 Kamwenge Branch - Kamwenge, Kamwenge District
 Kole Branch - Kole, Kole District
 Zombo Branch - Zombo, Zombo District

Regional Network
In January 2009, Global Trust Bank announced plans to expand operations into the neighboring countries of Burundi, Rwanda and South Sudan. In November 2009, the bank announced that it would pivot its focus towards small and medium enterprises (SMEs), using Internet-based and mobile-phone platforms. A reduction in the number of branches was contemplated, but was not implemented. In May 2011, the bank joined "Bankcom Network", a bank switch system that connects the ATMs of member banks. Global Trust Bank was the 8th Ugandan commercial bank to join the Bankcom switch.

Bank Chief Executive
In December 2008, Richard Byarugaba, a Ugandan with over 25 years of banking experience became the first managing director of Global Trust Bank. Prior to that, Byarugaba worked in various capacities at Barclays Bank, Nile Bank Limited and Standard Chartered Bank. He was Chief Operations Officer at Barclays Bank immediately before joining Global Trust Bank. He had held several board positions at Standard Chartered Bank, Nile Bank, Hospice Africa, Palliative Care Association of Uganda and the Uganda Institute of Banking and Financial Services.  He is also a past president of the Uganda Institute of Bankers.

In August 2010, following the appointment of Richard Byarugaba as the executive director of the National Social Security Fund, Charles Ajaegbu, a native of Nigeria, with over 20 years of banking experience, was appointed Managing Director of the bank. He holds degrees in Law and Business. Prior to that, he served as the Director of Business Development at Global Trust Bank.

, the Managing Director of GTBU was Morenikeji Oludotun Adepoju, a native Nigerian with over 22 years of banking experience in Anglophone and Francophone West Africa.

Liquidation
On Friday 25 July 2014, the Bank of Uganda, revoked the banking license of Global Trust Bank and closed down the institution with immediate effect. DFCU Bank acquired some of GTB's assets and liabilities, including customer deposits and loan accounts. Those assets DFCU Bank did not acquire are to be liquidated. Bank of Uganda cited two reasons for the closure. The first was lack of profitability. At the time of liquidation, GTB had accumulated losses totaling UGX:60 billion (US$24 million). The second was lack of "accuracy of the information provided to government".

Photos
Headquarters of Global Trust Bank on Kampala Road

See also

 Banking in Uganda
 List of banks in Uganda
 National Insurance Corporation
 Industrial and General Insurance Company

References

External sources
 Global Trust Bank Website
 Profile At Banks-Uganda.com
 Global Trust Bank Profile In 2012

Kampala District
Banks established in 2008
2008 establishments in Uganda
Defunct banks of Uganda
Banks disestablished in 2014
2014 disestablishments in Uganda